The Transvaal Open was a golf tournament in South Africa. In later years it was a fixture on the South African Sunshine Circuit.

Winners
 1911 Laurie Waters
 1912 No tournament
 1913 Jock Brews
 1914–18 No tournament
 1919 Laurie Waters
 1920 Laurie Waters
 1921 Jock Brews
 1922 Fred Jangle
 1923 Jock Brews
 1924 Sid Brews
 1925 No tournament
 1926 Bert Elkin
 1927 Charles McIlvenny
 1928 No tournament
 1929 Charles McIlvenny
 1930 Sid Brews
 1931 Sid Brews
 1932 Sid Brews
 1933 Sid Brews
 1934 Sid Brews
 1935 Sid Brews 
 1936 Sid Brews (285)
 1937 Bobby Locke (286) amateur
 1938 Bobby Locke (277)
 1939 Bobby Locke (265)
 1940 Bobby Locke
 1941–45 No tournament
 1946 Bobby Locke
 1947 Roderick Dunn
 1948 Otway Hayes
 1949 Bobby Locke
 1950 Bobby Locke (280)
 1951 Bobby Locke
 1952 Sandy Guthrie
 1953 Tommy Trevena
 1954 Bobby Locke (265)
 1955 Bobby Locke (285)
 1956 Bruce Keyter (281)
 1957 Harold Henning (278)
 1958 Bobby Locke  (276) 
 1959 Gary Player (266)
 1960 Gary Player (271)
 1961 (Jan) Alan Brookes
 1961 (Dec) Gary Player (266)
 1962 Gary Player (279)
 1963 Retief Waltman (277)
 1965 Bobby Verwey (279)
 1966 Gary Player
 1967 Allan Henning (274)
 1968 Cobie Legrange
 1969 Bobby Verwey (272)
 1970 John Bland
 1971 Peter Oosterhuis (279)
 1972 Bobby Cole
 1973 (Jan) John Fourie (280)
 1973 (Dec) Hugh Baiocchi (276)
 1974 Vin Baker

Sources:

References

Golf tournaments in South Africa
Former Sunshine Tour events
Recurring sporting events established in 1911
Recurring sporting events disestablished in 1974